Five ships and one shore establishment of the Royal Navy have been named HMS President, after the office of president meaning "one who presides over an assembly". In the case of the first two British ships, the name may have  applied to the Lord President of the Privy Council.  

These captures were commemorated by a new *, which survived from 1829 till 1903, and which passed the name to a series of Presidents of which three survive to this day.

 HMS President (1646) was a 26-gun ship purchased in 1646, known as Old President after 1650, and sold in 1656.
  was a 42-gun fourth rate ship launched in 1650, renamed Bonaventure in 1660, rebuilt 1666, and broken up 1711.
 HMS President (1806) was a 38-gun fifth rate ship, originally the French , captured in 1806, renamed Piedmontaise in 1815 and broken up in the same year.
 HMS President (1815) was a 44-gun fifth rate, originally the American frigate , captured in 1815 and broken up June 1818.
  was a 52-gun fourth rate launched in 1829, used as a drill ship of the Royal Naval Reserve after 1862 and sold in 1903. She was briefly known as Old President for part of 1903.
  is the home of the London Division of the Royal Naval Reserve. It has been a shore establishment near Tower Bridge overlooking the entrance to St Katharine Docks since 1988.  Ships that have been previously renamed HMS President whilst serving as the home of the London Division of the Royal Naval Reserve include:
 , an  screw sloop, launched in 1878 and renamed HMS President in 1903.  She was sold in 1911, but survived to be displayed in Chatham Historic Dockyard.
 , a  screw sloop launched in 1887 and renamed HMS President in 1911.  She was lent away in 1919 and sold in 1921.
 HMS Marjoram, an  sloop was to have been the next HMS President, but she was wrecked before she could be refitted.
 HMS Saxifrage, an Anchusa-class sloop launched in 1918 instead became HMS President in 1921, serving as such until 1988. She is now permanently berthed in the River Thames on the Victoria Embankment.

Battle honours
Portland 1653
Gabbard 1653
Scheveningen 1653
Java 1811
San Sebastian 1813.

See also
 , 19th-century steamer
 , 20th-century steamer
 

Royal Navy ship names